Pack burro racing is a sport in Colorado that is rooted in the state's mining history. In the early days of the mining industry in Colorado, miners would take donkeys (burros in Spanish) through the mountains of Colorado while prospecting. Because the burros were carrying supplies, the miners could not ride the animals and so they would walk, leading the donkey. Burro races are held throughout small towns in Colorado to commemorate the miners and their burros. In 2012, pack burro racing was recognized as the official "summer heritage sport" in Colorado.

Legend holds that the races trace back to an incident in which two miners, finding gold at the same location simultaneously, raced each other to the claims office. Because the burros were too small or loaded to carry their owners, the miners were forced to run, leading the burros.

Format

In a typical burro race, a runner and a burro travel a prescribed course together, with the runner leading the burro on a rope. Riding the burro is not allowed, though the human may carry the burro. Runners must maintain control of their animals at all times. Burros must also carry a pack saddle with 33 pounds (15 kilograms) of traditional mining gear, which must include a pick, gold pan, and shovel. Runners may also include other gear in their pack saddles, such as windbreakers, water, food, etc., but the surplus gear cannot be counted in the 33 lb. Cruelty to the burro is prohibited and racing officials may have burros examined by a veterinarian after the race.

Competition
Like horse racing, burro racing has its own "Triple Crown," consisting of three races.

Fairplay
It takes place in late July as part of Fairplay's Burro Days town festival. The race begins on the main street and goes to the top of Mosquito Pass.

Leadville
The Leadville race is 22 miles. It takes place the first full weekend of August, typically a week after the Fairplay race, as part of the Leadville's Boom Days city festival. The race goes to the top of Mosquito Pass, then comes back into town through the California Gulch Mining District, past the site of Oro City.

Buena Vista
The Buena Vista race is 12 miles. It typically takes place a week after the Leadville race as part of Buena Vista's Gold Rush Days festival.

Other races
In addition to the Colorado Triple Crown Races, other mining towns throughout Colorado are adding burro races to their event schedule, usually as part of an existing town festival. Towns include:
 Georgetown, Colorado
 Cripple Creek, Colorado
 Idaho Springs, Colorado
 Creede, Colorado
 Victor, Colorado
 Frederick, Colorado

Outside Colorado, versions of this sport have historically been enjoyed in other states going back to the 1950s in Big Bear, CA with the Old Miners Days Burro Race; and in the 1960s in Beatty, NV which hosted their annual Burro Race using a ready supply of wild burros from the historic Bullfrog Mining District.

Nowadays, the excitement generated by Colorado's enthusiastic embrace of the sport is now beginning to fuel an interest in other western states. In 2019, Superior, AZ celebrated its own mining and burro history with the Arizona inaugural Superior Burro Run. In 2020, organizers in both California and New Mexico plan to host their own versions of the event with inaugural races in both states.

Notable competitors
 Curtis Imrie, three time world champion

References

External links
 Western Pack Burro Ass

Racing
Sports in Colorado
Donkeys
Colorado culture
Novelty running